Radio Constanța is a Romanian regional public radio station in Constanța.

References

Radio stations in Romania
Mass media in Constanța
Constanța